Faccio is a surname, and may refer to:

Adele Faccio (1920–2007): Italian politician
Franco Faccio (1840–1891): 19th Century Italian opera composer and conductor at La Scala
Nicolas Faccio (1664–1753): Swiss mathematician; alternative name for Nicolas Fatio de Duillier    
Ricardo Faccio (1907–1970): An Uruguayan-Italian professional football player. Was Ricardo Gregorio Faccio Porta, but known as Ricardo Faccio or Riccardo Faccio.

See also
Facio
Fatio